Karumanassery is a small village in Kerala, India.  It is about 5 kilometers from Vadakkencherry on National Highway 47, midway between Palakkad and Thrissur. This village has a well-known car festival (theru) on last week of December every year.

References

Villages in Palakkad district